The 2022–23 Maine Black Bears women's basketball team represents the University of Maine in the 2022–23 NCAA Division I women's basketball season. The Black Bears, led by head coach Amy Vachon, play their home games at The Pit in Memorial Gymnasium on the University of Maine campus and are members of the America East Conference.

Media
All home games and conference road games will stream on either ESPN3 or AmericaEast.tv. Most road games will stream on the opponents website. All games will be broadcast on the radio on WEZQ (92.9 The Ticket) and online on the Maine Portal.

Roster
The Maine Black Bears currently have 15 different players on their team, the tallest player being Katie White at 6'2", and the shortest player being Olivia Rockwood at 5'5". They currently have 11 guards, and 4 forwards.

Schedule and results
The Maine Black Bears will play a total of 13 games in the non-conference regular season, and 16 games in the American East regular season.
|-
!colspan=9 style=| Non-conference regular season

|-
!colspan=12 style=|America East regular season

|-
!colspan=9 style=| America East tournament

See also
2022–23 Maine Black Bears men's basketball team

References

Maine Black Bears women's basketball seasons
Maine Black Bears
Maine Black Bears women's basketball
Maine Black Bears women's basketball